is a Japanese former swimmer who competed in the 1984 Summer Olympics in the 200 m and 400 m individual medleys.

References

1963 births
Living people
Japanese male medley swimmers
Olympic swimmers of Japan
Swimmers at the 1984 Summer Olympics
Asian Games medalists in swimming
Swimmers at the 1982 Asian Games
Asian Games bronze medalists for Japan
Medalists at the 1982 Asian Games
20th-century Japanese people